The Ansei Treaties (Japanese:安政条約) or the Ansei Five-Power Treaties (Japanese:安政五カ国条約) are a series of treaties signed in 1858, during the Japanese Ansei era, between Japan on the one side, and the United States, Great Britain, Russia, Netherlands and France on the other. The first treaty, also called the Harris Treaty, was signed by the United States in July 1858, with France, Russia, Britain and the Netherlands quickly followed within the year: Japan applied to the other nations the conditions granted to the United States under the "most favoured nation" provision.

Content
The most important points of these "unequal treaties" are:

 Exchange of diplomatic agents.
 Edo, Kobe, Nagasaki, Niigata, and Yokohama’s opening to foreign trade as ports.
 Ability of foreign citizens to live and trade at will in those ports (only the opium trade was prohibited).
 A system of extraterritoriality that provided for the subjugation of foreign residents to the laws of their own consular courts instead of the Japanese legal system.
 Fixed low import-export duties, subject to international control, thus preventing the Japanese government from asserting control over foreign trade and protection of national industries (the rate would go as low as 5% in the 1860s.)

Components
The five treaties known collectively as the Ansei Treaties were:

 The Treaty of Amity and Commerce between the United States and Japan (Harris Treaty) on July 29, 1858.
 The  on August 18, 1858.
 The  on August 19, 1858.
 The Anglo-Japanese Treaty of Amity and Commerce on August 26, 1858.
 The Treaty of Amity and Commerce between France and Japan on October 9, 1858.

See also
 List of treaties

Notes

References
 Auslin, Michael R. (2004).   Negotiating with Imperialism: The Unequal Treaties and the Culture of Japanese Diplomacy. Cambridge: Harvard University Press. ;  OCLC 56493769

Further reading
 Omoto Keiko, Marcouin Francis (1990) Quand le Japon s'ouvrit au monde (French) Gallimard, Paris, 
 Polak, Christian. (2001). Soie et lumières: L'âge d'or des échanges franco-japonais (des origines aux années 1950). Tokyo: Chambre de Commerce et d'Industrie Française du Japon, Hachette Fujin Gahōsha (アシェット婦人画報社).
 __. (2002). 絹と光: 知られざる日仏交流100年の歴史 (江戶時代-1950年代) Kinu to hikariō: shirarezaru Nichi-Futsu kōryū 100-nen no rekishi (Edo jidai-1950-nendai). Tokyo: Ashetto Fujin Gahōsha, 2002. ;

See also
 France-Japan relations (19th century)

1858 in Japan
1858 treaties
Bakumatsu
Treaties of the Tokugawa shogunate
Treaties of the United States
Treaties of the United Kingdom (1801–1922)
Treaties of the Russian Empire
Treaties of the Second French Empire
Treaties of the Netherlands
1850s in the Russian Empire